Pavel Golovin (26 April 1909 – 27 April 1940) was a Soviet polar aviation pilot and colonel.

Biography 
Golovin was the world's first pilot to fly over the North Pole, on 5 May 1937.

Awards and honors 

 Hero of the Soviet Union
 Order of Lenin
 Order of the Red Banner
 Order of the Red Star

A street in his city of birth, Naro-Fominsk, is named after him.

References

1909 births
1940 deaths
Burials at Novodevichy Cemetery
Heroes of the Soviet Union
Soviet aviators
Soviet test pilots
Aviators killed in aviation accidents or incidents
Soviet Air Force officers
Recipients of the Order of the Red Banner
Victims of aviation accidents or incidents in 1940
Victims of aviation accidents or incidents in the Soviet Union